Panturichthys is a genus of eels of the family Heterenchelyidae that occur in tropical waters along the west coast of Africa from the Gulf of Guinea to Morocco with one species known from the eastern Mediterranean near Israel. It contains the following described species:

 Panturichthys fowleri (Ben-Tuvia, 1953)
 Panturichthys isognathus Poll, 1953
 Panturichthys longus (Ehrenbaum, 1915)
 Panturichthys mauritanicus Pellegrin, 1913 (Mauritanian shortface eel)

References

Eels
Heterenchelyidae
Taxa named by Jacques Pellegrin